Ashraf Gamil (born 1 April 1946) is an Egyptian water polo player. He competed at the 1964 Summer Olympics and the 1968 Summer Olympics.

References

1946 births
Living people
Egyptian male water polo players
Olympic water polo players of Egypt
Water polo players at the 1964 Summer Olympics
Water polo players at the 1968 Summer Olympics
Sportspeople from Cairo
20th-century Egyptian people